Oronde Benjamin Gadsden II (born June 25, 2003) is an American football tight end for the Syracuse Orange.

Career
Gadsden II attended American Heritage School in Plantation, Florida. He committed to Syracuse University to play college football.

As a true freshman at Syracuse in 2021, Gadsden II, played in eight games and had two receptions for 24 yards. He entered 2022 as both a wide receiver and tight end.

Sophomore Year
In Robert Anae's pass-heavy offense, Gadsden moved from outside receiver to a hybrid of slot receiver and tight end. He was asked to block more and make catches in the middle of the field.

The move paid off for Gadsden, who was named First Team All-ACC after recording 61 receptions for 969 yards and six touchdowns. The receptions mark is the highest single season total for a Syracuse sophomore. Playing against NC State on October 15, 2022, Gadsden earned ACC Receiver of the Week honors, as he hauled in eight passes for 141 yards and 2 touchdowns. At season's end, Gadsden was given the Bill Maxwell Award as the most improved player in the Syracuse offense.

Personal life
His father, Oronde Gadsden, played in the NFL.

References

External links
Syracuse Orange bio

2003 births
Living people
People from Miramar, Florida
Players of American football from Florida
American football wide receivers
American football tight ends
Syracuse Orange football players